People of No Importance is a 1956 French drama film directed by Henri Verneuil. Set entirely among ordinary working people, it tells the story of an unhappily married long-distance lorry driver who starts an affair with a young waitress at a restaurant where he stops frequently, but tragedy intervenes.

Plot
Jean is a long-distance lorry driver whose usual run is from Paris, where he lives with his unsympathetic wife and children, to Bordeaux. A favourite stop is La Caravane, a roadside restaurant where he is attracted to Clo, a pretty and affectionate young woman who is estranged from her family and survives by waitressing. Anxious to be with him, she gives up her job and goes to Paris, where she finds work as a chambermaid in a sordid hotel used by prostitutes. She also finds that she is pregnant, which the hotel manager resolves by sending her for an illegal abortion. Jean meanwhile has been sacked, partly because his tachograph showed too much time spent at La Caravane, and as soon as he finds another job he arranges to take her home in his lorry. But septicaemia has set in and, though he stops on the way and calls an ambulance, she dies.

Cast
 Jean Gabin as Jean Viard, lorry driver and lover of Clo
 Françoise Arnoul as Clotilde Brachet, called Clo, waitress
 Pierre Mondy as Pierrot Berty, Jean's co-driver
 Paul Frankeur as Émile Barchandeau, owner of La Caravane
 Yvette Etiévant as Solange Viard, Jean's wife
 Dany Carrel as Jacqueline Viard, Jean's teenage daughter
 Lila Kedrova as Madame Vacopoulos, hotel manager

References

External links 

1956 drama films
1956 films
Films about abortion
French drama films
French black-and-white films
1950s French films